Nobuhito (written: 信人 or 伸人) is a masculine Japanese given name. Notable people with the name include:

Nobuhito, Prince Takamatsu (1905–1987), Japanese prince, third son of Emperor Taishō
, Japanese golfer
, Japanese footballer

Japanese masculine given names